Nui! is a three-volume manga series by Natsumi Mukai. This story is about a girl named Kaya who has just celebrated her sixteenth birthday; on that day, she discovers that her stuffed animal Purple is alive and has been secretly protecting Kaya all her life.

Plot
The plot centers around Kaya and her three stuffed animals: Purple, Gray, and Aqua. Because Kaya loves and cares for her stuffed animals so much they are able to have souls, as long as Kaya keeps loving them their souls will be allowed to live on. As the legend goes, if a stuffed animal experiences a 'High Emotional Moment' they can then do a 'Human Transform' in which they are able to become human for a short period of time. As Kaya and her stuffed animals go on adventures they meet other stuffed animals and their owners. Finding out along the way that although some are nice, there are others who are not so kind, meaning Purple, Gray and Aqua are frequently forced to protect Kaya whilst struggling to keep their secret identities hidden from the rest of the world.

Information on USA Publisher

NUI! volumes were published in the USA by Broccoli Books for a time. But due to the fact that Broccoli Books USA shut down()it is no longer available in the English language. NUI! has yet to be picked up by another US publisher.

Main characters

Kaya Yamase
A girl who just turned sixteen and has discovered her dolls are alive. When she was little she found Purple abandoned on a dirt floor. Assuming that he was "dead" she buried him until an elderly woman claimed that in doing so, the doll would curse her. Apologizing to the doll, she later took Purple in as her first stuffed animal. She has black hair that is tied back and blue eyes.

Purple
Kaya's first stuffed animal. Because he has been with Kaya much longer than the other two stuffed animals Kaya owns, he often shows more determination to protect Kaya from dangers. He is depicted as a cotton purple doll with long, spotted ears and tail. In his human form, he has pale hair and eyes and his spotted ears turn into a cap.

Gray
Another one of Kaya's dolls, he seems to be a wool-made, gray dog. He is very loyal and was made by Kaya's mother. In human form, he has shaggy black hair, dog ears, and a collar around his neck.

Aqua
A blue polyester fish stuffed animal that belongs to Kaya, he was bought at an aquarium. He often longs to swim in the ocean (he can't or else he will get wet) and succeeds in one chapter when he is sealed in a plastic bag. In his human form he has long, pale hair and a fish necklace.

Pink
A pink Pegasus girl stuffed animal made by Kaya. She came alive the time she was born when Kaya had developed feelings for Shinri Harihara. She is the only girl stuffed animal and has a sweet demeanor.

Tetsu Tsuchida
Tetsu is a schoolmate of Kaya and lives and works at a craft shop. He likes Kaya and wants to be friends with her, but he is too timid to approach her at first.

Shinri Harihara
He creates stuffed animals and knows that they have a soul when their creator loves them. Shinri is nice to Kaya, but he wants Purple to be eliminated. He dropped out of middle school to make stuffed animals.

Bianca/Nera
Both the same stuffed animal, he lives with Shinri. When Bianca (in white) turns black, his personality turns aggressive. He has wings and as such is able to fly.

2006 manga
Shōnen manga